The House at 1116 Columbia, at 1116 Columbia Avenue in Las Vegas, New Mexico, was listed on the National Register of Historic Places in 1985.

It is a vernacular-style stuccoed wood-framed house upon a stuccoed foundation.  It has a front-facing gable whose eaves include a cutout bargeboard and pendant.  Based on the style it was probably built in the 1880s or early 1890s. It has an off-center porch with stick railing and frieze which was added c.1910.

It is in the easternpart of the Sulzbacher and Rosenwald Addition (see also "Building #1559" in State Survey series).

References

External links

National Register of Historic Places in San Miguel County, New Mexico